Daphné Patakia (born 8 June 1992) is a Belgian-born Greek actress.

Life
She was raised in Brussels, where she had been born to Greek parents. She then began her actor training at the National Theatre of Greece in Athens, graduating from there in 2013 and acting in a number of Greek films before moving to Paris and shifting to an international career. 

In 2017 she and Maryne Cayon took the title role in the film Djam, directed by Tony Gatlif. In 2021 she appeared in Paul Verhoeven's Benedetta alongside Virginie Efira, Charlotte Rampling and Lambert Wilson. The same year she gained one of the main roles in the French TV series OVNI(s).

Filmography

Shorts
 2015 : Akryliko, directed by Nikos Pastras : Myrto
 2016 : 3000, directed by Antonis Tsonis : Daphné
 2017 : Glister, directed by Vincent Tricon : Lucica
 2019 : Nimic, directed by Yórgos Lánthimos : Mimic

Features 
 2015 : Interruption, directed by Yorgos Zois : fille de la troupe
 2015 : L'Éveil du printemps (Το ξύπνημα της άνοιξης / Spring Awakening), directed by Constantínos Giánnaris : Ioanna
 2016 : Nima, directed by Alexandros Voulgaris : la fille muette en roller
 2017 : Rattrapage, directed by Tristan Séguéla : Mélanie
 2017 : Djam, directed by Tony Gatlif : Djam
 2018 : A Paris Education, directed by Jean-Paul Civeyrac : invitée à la soirée
 2019 : Meltem, directed by Basile Doganis : Elena
 2019 : Winona, directed by Alexander Voulgaris : Eiko
 2021 : Benedetta, directed by Paul Verhoeven : Bartolomea
 2021 : Tout le monde m'appelle Mike, directed by Guillaume Bonnier : Isotta 
 2021 : Les Cinq Diables, directed by Léa Mysius : Nadine

TV films
 2020 : Paris-Brest, directed by Philippe Lioret : Élise

TV series 
 2018 : Versailles: Eleanor of Austria
 2021-present : OVNI(s), directed by Antony Cordier : Véra Clouseau

References 

1992 births
Actresses from Brussels
Belgian people of Greek descent
Belgian film actresses
Belgian television actresses
21st-century Belgian actresses
Greek film actresses
Greek television actresses
21st-century Greek actresses
Living people